Galina Pavlovna Matviyevskaya (Russian Галина Павловна Матвиевская; born 13 July 1930 in Dnepropetrovsk) is a Soviet-Russian historian of mathematics,  and university teacher. In 1974, she won the Biruni State Prize.

Life 
Matviyevskaya attended school in Kharkov and in Chkalov. She graduated in 1948 with a gold medal. She graduated from the University of Leningrad, in 1954, and the Leningrad Department of the Moscow Institute of History of Science and Technology, in 1959. She studied unpublished manuscripts by Leonhard Euler on number theory. 

In 1959, she became a research associate at the Institute of Mathematics of the Academy of Sciences of the Soviet Socialist Republic of Uzbekistant. She  researched the history of mathematics in the Near and Middle East using medieval Arabic manuscripts.  In 1987 her work on the scholar Albrecht Dürer was published. She cooperated with Boris Abramovich Rosenfeld. 

In 1994 she became a professor at the Orenburg State Pedagogical University. In 1995, she became a member of the Académie internationale d'histoire des sciences. She has published works on Pyotr Ivanovich Rychkov, Vasily Alexeyevich Perovsky, Vladimir Ivanovich Dal, Yakov Vladimirovich Khanykov and others. It has been a member of the Union of Writers of Russia since 2000.

Works 

 with O. Bogolyubov ("Vsevolod Ivanovich Romanov (1879-1954)," Moscow, 1997).

References 

1930 births
Living people